Zemplínske Kopčany is a village and municipality in Michalovce District in the Kosice Region of eastern Slovakia.

History
In historical records the village was first mentioned in 1288.

Geography
The village lies at an altitude of 107 metres and covers an area of 13.47 km². The municipality has a population of about 218 people.

See also
 List of municipalities and towns in Michalovce District
 List of municipalities and towns in Slovakia

External links
https://web.archive.org/web/20070513023228/http://www.statistics.sk/mosmis/eng/run.html

Villages and municipalities in Michalovce District
Zemplín (region)